Muhammed Bozdağ (born 1967) is a Turkish writer who publishes primarily self-help literature based on a blend of Islamic and New Age concepts.

Background

Bozdağ was born in Akçaabat in Trabzon Province. He is the father of three children. He graduated from Middle East Technical University and has a PhD in Administration and Political Science from Hacettepe and Gazi Universities. He is legislative expert and public administrator in Turkish Parliament, and has written several books on personal development.

Work

His books, titled Düşün ve Başar (Think and Succeed), Ruhsal Zekà (Spiritual Sincerity Intelligence), İstemenin Esrarı (Mysteries of Wishing) and Sonsuzluk Yolculuğu (The Journey of Eternity) have had near one million copies printed in Turkey.

He wrote articles in journals like, Zafer and Köprü. Several interviews with him by newspapers like Taraf, Sabah, Star, and Hürriyet, give more information about his perspectives.
 
His second book Spiritual Sincerity Intelligence was translated into and printed in Russian and German languages.

References 

1967 births
Living people
People from Akçaabat
Postmodern writers
Turkish essayists
Turkish Muslims
Turkish writers
Turkish civil servants
Turkish scientists
Turkish non-fiction writers
Middle East Technical University alumni